Parrinello is an Italian surname. Notable people with the surname include:

Antonino Parrinello (born 1988), Italian cyclist
Michele Parrinello (born 1945), Italian physicist
Rich Parrinello (born 1950), American football coach
Tom Parrinello (born 1989), English footballer
Vittorio Parrinello (born 1983), Italian boxer

See also
Car–Parrinello molecular dynamics

Italian-language surnames